What I Really Want for Christmas is the sixth studio album by Brian Wilson and his first solo seasonal release.  It was released by Arista Records in October 2005 and features many traditional Christmas songs, as well some of Wilson's originals, including remakes of the Beach Boys' "Little Saint Nick" and "The Man with All the Toys". As a bonus, Wilson elected to include a sampling of seasonal recordings initially available on his website a few years earlier.

Critical reaction was mixed; the album eventually peaked at #200 for one week on the Billboard 200 chart in the US, though "Deck the Halls" became a Top 10 Adult Contemporary hit.

Track listing
All tracks Traditional; except where indicated

"The Man with All the Toys" (Brian Wilson, Mike Love) – 2:59
"What I Really Want for Christmas" (Wilson, Bernie Taupin) – 3:50
"God Rest Ye Merry Gentlemen" – 3:27
"O Holy Night" – 4:28
"We Wish You a Merry Christmas" – 2:36
"Hark the Herald Angels Sing" – 3:34
"It Came Upon a Midnight Clear" – 3:08
"The First Noel" – 4:47
"Christmasey" (Wilson, Jimmy Webb) – 4:08
"Little Saint Nick" (Wilson, Love) – 2:11
"Deck the Halls" – 2:36
"Auld Lang Syne" – 1:29
"On Christmas Day" (Wilson) – 3:23
"Joy to the World" – 2:06
"Silent Night" – 0:49
 Tracks 13–15 are bonus tracks, 13 and 15 having originally appeared on Wilson's website during 2000 and 2001. Track 14 was co-produced by an uncredited Joe Thomas and originally released in October 1997 on an obscure Christmas compilation.

Personnel
 Brian Wilson - Keyboards, Piano, Producer, Lead Vocals
Additional Musicians

References

External links
Press release

Brian Wilson albums
2005 Christmas albums
Christmas albums by American artists
Arista Records Christmas albums
Albums produced by Brian Wilson
Rock Christmas albums